BLAQ Memories is a compilation album released for the Japanese market. The album consists of MBLAQ's Korean songs, as well as a Japanese version of "You're My +". The album was released on March 7, 2012. Upon its release, the album landed at #9 on the Oricon Daily chart

Track listing

References

External links
 MBLAQ's Official Site

2012 compilation albums
MBLAQ albums